António Silva Cardoso (3 February 1928 - 13 June 2014) was High Commissioner and Governor-General of Angola in 1975. He was also an author who wrote two books.

References

1928 births
2014 deaths